International Hardcore Superstar is the sixth studio album by Danny Diablo. It was released on October 6, 2009, via Tim Armstrong's Hellcat Records. The record is the follow-up to his 2007 album Thugcore 4 Life.

Track listing

Samples 
"Sex And Violence" contains samples of The Exploited's song "Sex & Violence" from their 1981 album Punks Not Dead

Personnel 
Dan Singer - main performer, producer 
Erik Schrody - performer 
Jack Gonzalez - performer 
Natasha Nicholson - additional vocals
Richard Alfaro - performer
Tim Armstrong - producer, performer
Toby Morse - additional vocals
Vincenzo Luvineri - performer 
Big Left, Ceekay Jones, Prince Metropolitan - guest performers

References 

2010 albums
Danny Diablo albums
Epitaph Records albums
Hellcat Records albums